Acrolophus pseudohirsutus is a moth of the family Acrolophidae. It was described by Hasbrouck in 1964. It is found in North America, including California and Arizona. It is also found in Brazil.

References

Moths described in 1964
pseudohirsutus